The Malwal River (or Khor Malwal, Malual) is a river in South Sudan. 
It flows through Unity State, coming from Warrap and crossing Abiemnom, Mayom County and Rubkona on its way to the Bahr el Arab (Kiir River).

References

Rivers of South Sudan